Doron Merdinger  (born 1968) is an Israeli-American tableware and jewelry designer. He is the founder of the Merdinger House of Design based in Miami, Florida.

Early life and education
Doron Merdinger was born in 1968 in Israel. His father owned a traditional Judaica silversmith company, Hazorfim. Merdinger studied microelectronics and computers in High- School. He then continued his education aboard, studying Business Administration at San Diego and then at New York University, where he graduated with honors. He returned to Israel to re-launch his family’s Hazorfim business as the administrator, marketing director and CEO. After 12 years, the business employed 200 employees with a turnover of 80 million.

Career
Merdinger's first collection used pioneering new computer-assisted design (CAD) software created with 5 other designers. The design technique used took two years to develop and create the Arabesque pattern. It is the world's first fully integrated tableware collection that used 3D files and laser cutting technology. This includes the Arabesque, Jacob's Ladder, and Rope and Sails collection.

Sustainable materials and cultural impact 
Merdinger uses precious stones, porcelain, metals, crystals and exotic woods.

In an interview Merdinger was quoted saying, “My message to the world is that there is a God and he does not belong only to the Jews, the Christians or the Muslims. We need to understand that we need to share Him, not fight about Him. My creations are a symbol of the higher world since their morphology is unique -- they were created in the virtual reality, the higher world. They show there’s more to life than physical items.”

Recognition 
Merdinger's collection has been carried by the British tableware store Thomas Goode and served at the Emirates Palace Hotel in Abu Dubai. His work has been covered by news and media outlets such as the Israel Ministry of Foreign Affairs, the Globes Israel's Business Arena, Tableware Today and Israel National News. He was asked to create a customized set for the court of the King of Dubai and has designed a personalized $10,000 necklace for Madonna.

References

American jewelry designers
American people of Israeli descent
1968 births
Living people